The anterior ulnar recurrent artery is an artery in the forearm. It is one of two recurrent arteries that arises from the ulnar artery, the other being the posterior ulnar recurrent artery.

It arises from the ulnar artery immediately below the elbow-joint, runs upward between the brachialis and pronator teres muscle and supplies twigs to those muscles. In front of the medial epicondyle it anastomoses with the superior and Inferior ulnar collateral arteries.

See also
 Posterior ulnar recurrent artery

References

External links
 
 

Arteries of the upper limb